William Michael "Hoot" Hootkins (July 5, 1948 – October 23, 2005) was an American actor, best known for supporting roles in Hollywood blockbusters such as Star Wars, Raiders of the Lost Ark, and Batman.

Early life
Hootkins was born in Dallas, Texas. He attended St. Mark's School of Texas from grade 1 through 12. At age 15, Hootkins found himself caught up in the FBI's investigation into the assassination of President John F. Kennedy when he was interviewed about Ruth Paine, his Russian teacher.  Marina Oswald, the Russian wife of the assassin Lee Harvey Oswald, and their children had been living with Paine in Dallas.  In school he also developed his taste for theatre, joining the same drama group as Tommy Lee Jones, who was a year ahead of him in high school. Hootkins would later say that, since Jones was better-looking and got all the best parts, "I supported from then on in."

Hootkins attended Princeton University, studying astrophysics before transferring to oriental studies, where he became fluent in Mandarin Chinese. This stood him in good stead when he played the part of an interpreter in an episode of The West Wing titled "Impact Winter". He was a mainstay of the Theatre Intime, making a particular impact with his performance in Orson Welles' Moby Dick—Rehearsed. On the recommendation of his friend John Lithgow, he moved to London in the early 1970s and trained as an actor at the London Academy of Music and Dramatic Art (LAMDA). He made his home in London until 2002, when he moved to Los Angeles.

Acting career

Stage
In England, Hootkins found work in the theatre as well as in film, and he would have his greatest success on stage portraying Alfred Hitchcock in Terry Johnson's 2003 hit play Hitchcock Blonde, first at the Royal Court Theatre and in London's West End. The role was such a success that producers planned to take the show to Broadway, but it was canceled after he was diagnosed with cancer.

Film and television
Hootkins appeared in many roles that made him a welcome figure at fan conventions, particularly for Star Wars in his role of Jek Tono Porkins. He also appeared in significant parts in films such as Hardware (1990), Like Father, Like Santa (as Santa Claus), and Hear My Song (1991), where he was the Mr. X who was presumed to be the Irish tenor Josef Locke under a false name. He portrayed Fatty Arbuckle in Ken Russell's infamous 1977 flop Valentino, and played Hans Zarkov's assistant in the 1980 Flash Gordon. He also made appearances in such films as Raiders of the Lost Ark and Tim Burton's Batman (the latter as Lt. Eckhardt).

He also appeared in several roles on television, including Charles Frohman in The Lost Boys (1978), Colonel Cobb in the remake of The Tomorrow People and as Uncle George in the 2002 remake of The Magnificent Ambersons.

At the time of his death, Hootkins was planning a screenplay on Fatty Arbuckle, focusing on the comic's life after his fall from grace in 1921; he had met Arbuckle's last wife, Addie McPhail.

Voice acting
Hootkins was also a voice artist, recording dozens of plays for BBC Radio Drama where his roles ranged from J. Edgar Hoover and Orson Welles to Winston Churchill. In audio books, he read works by Jack London, Henry Wadsworth Longfellow, Robert Bloch and Carl Hiaasen and performed a complete reading of Herman Melville's Moby-Dick for Naxos Records Audiobooks in some 24 hours and 50 minutes. He also voiced Dingodile in Crash Bandicoot 3: Warped, Maximillian Roivas in the cult hit Eternal Darkness: Sanity's Requiem, and Lucifer in the stop-motion film The Miracle Maker. He played Bobby Mallory in BBC Radio4's dramatisations of Sara Paretsky's V. I. Warshawski novels, alongside Kathleen Turner. He also voiced Lex Luthor in Radio 4's The Adventures of Superman.

Death
Hootkins died of pancreatic cancer in Santa Monica, California on October 23, 2005, at the age of 57. His mausoleum is at Sparkman-Hillcrest Memorial Park Cemetery.

Filmography

Film

Television

Video games

References

External links

In Loving Memory Of William Hootkins

1948 births
2005 deaths
Alumni of the London Academy of Music and Dramatic Art
American male film actors
American male stage actors
American male television actors
American male video game actors
American male voice actors
Burials at Sparkman-Hillcrest Memorial Park Cemetery
Deaths from cancer in California
Deaths from pancreatic cancer
Male actors from Dallas
People associated with the assassination of John F. Kennedy
Princeton University alumni
St. Mark's School (Texas) alumni
20th-century American male actors